Emilie von Büttner (1804–1867) was a German flower and botanical painter.

References

Botanical illustrators
1804 births
1867 deaths
19th-century German painters